Outardes-3 is a hydroelectric power station and dam on the Outardes River  northwest of Baie-Comeau, Quebec, Canada. The power station was commissioned in 1969 and is run-of-the-river.

Near the eastern portion of the lake, two depressions were filled in with small dikes to withhold the higher lake level, one of which supports a concrete spillway. From the intake on the northern portion of the concrete dam, water is fed via four  penstocks towards the underground power station.

See also

 List of largest power stations in Canada
 List of hydroelectric stations in Quebec
 Outardes-2
 McCormick Dam
 Jean-Lesage generating station
 René-Lévesque generating station
 Daniel-Johnson Dam

Notes

References
 .

Energy infrastructure completed in 1969
Manicouagan-Outardes hydroelectric project
Run-of-the-river power stations
Underground power stations
Gravity dams
Dams completed in 1969
Dams in Quebec
1969 establishments in Quebec
Publicly owned dams in Canada